Werner Pöls (March 15, 1926 – February 21, 1989) was a  German historian and politician, representative of the German Christian Democratic Union.

Literature 
Wolfgang Weber: Biographisches Lexikon zur Geschichtswissenschaft in Deutschland, Österreich und der Schweiz. Die Lehrstuhlinhaber für Geschichte von den Anfängen des Faches bis 1970. Frankfurt/M. u. a. 1984, S. 449, 
Das Historische Seminar der Technischen Universität Braunschweig 1969–1982. Braunschweig 1982 [Werner Pöls anlässlich seiner Emeritierung gewidmet; verfielfältigtes Typoskript, vorhanden in der Universitätsbibliothek Braunschweig]
Günther Grünthal und Klaus Erich Pollmann: Einleitung. In: Werner Pöls, Studien zur Bismarckzeit. Aufsatzsammlung zum 60. Geburtstag. [darin zehn wieder abgedruckte Aufsätze von Pöls], hrsg. von Günther Grünthal und Klaus Erich Pollmann, Hildesheim u. a. 1986, S. VII-XI, 
Franz J. Bauer: Geschichte des Deutschen Hochschulverbandes. München 2000, S. 181–187 u. öfter,

See also
List of German Christian Democratic Union politicians

References

External links
 Christlich Demokratische Union Deutschlands web site

Christian Democratic Union of Germany politicians
1926 births
1989 deaths
20th-century German historians
German male non-fiction writers
Academic staff of the Technical University of Braunschweig
Officers Crosses of the Order of Merit of the Federal Republic of Germany